Ernest Nathan de Vos (1 July 1941 in The Hague, Netherlands – 5 March 2005 in St. Petersburg, Florida) was a Canadian racing driver.

Career
After his family moved from the Netherlands to Canada when he was young, de Vos started his racing career in karts. Moving up to Canadian Formula Junior, he was generally the second fastest driver at the time, behind John Cannon.

He had a brief experience in Formula One when he was entered in the 1963 United States Grand Prix in a second Stebro-Ford carrying #19, although only one car was present at the circuit, with #21. Peter Broeker drove the car in practice and the race, and de Vos and other reserve driver Ludwig Heimrath Sr. did not take part.

De Vos died in a cycling accident in Florida in 2005.

Complete Formula One results
(key)

References

1941 births
2005 deaths
Canadian Formula One drivers
Vos, Ernie de